The .257 Roberts, also known as .257 Bob, is a medium-powered .25 caliber rifle cartridge. It has been described as the best compromise between the low recoil and flat trajectory of smaller calibers such as the 5 mm (.22 in) and 6 mm (.24 in), and the higher energy but harder recoil of larger popular hunting calibers, such as the 7 mm (.28 in) family and the popular 7.62 mm (.30 in).

Nominal bullet diameter of the .257 Roberts is .257 inches. The .257 Roberts uses the same caliber bullets as .250 Savage or the more powerful .25-06 Remington. Barrel rifling diameter, from which calibers derive their designations, is 0.250 in or 6.35 mm.

History
Many cartridge designers in the 1920s were creating various 6.35 mm (.25 in) caliber cartridges. Due to the availability of inexpensive Mauser actions, the 7×57mm Mauser case was a common choice, having near ideal volume capacity for the "quarter-bore" (0.25 in; 6.35 mm) using powders available at that time. Ned Roberts is usually credited with being the designer for this cartridge. Eventually, in 1934, Remington Arms chose to introduce their own commercial version of such a cartridge, and although it was not the exact dimensions of the wildcat made by Roberts, they called it the ".257 Roberts".

From its introduction until the appearance of 6 mm cartridges such as .243 Winchester and 6mm Remington, it was a very popular general purpose cartridge. Today, although surpassed in popularity by other cartridges, it lives on with bolt-action rifles being available from some major manufacturers.

Conversion of war-souvenir Japanese Arisaka rifles
Japanese Type 38 Arisaka rifles brought to the United States as wartime souvenirs were sometimes converted by rechambering to utilize more readily available .257 Roberts cartridge cases because commercially produced 6.5×50mm Arisaka cartridges were scarce prior to distribution by Norma Projektilfabrik A/S. The neck of the Roberts case would be slightly enlarged to accept handloaded 6.5 mm bullets. The modified Roberts cases are sometimes known as "6.5×.257 Roberts", although the case headstamp may still indicate .257 Roberts. Neither unmodified .257 Roberts ammunition nor the original 6.5×50mm Arisaka ammunition are suitable for firing in rechambered Arisaka rifles.

Performance

With light bullets, the .257 produces little recoil and has a flat trajectory suitable for varmint hunting. With heavier bullets it produces more recoil, but is capable of taking all but the largest North American game animals. The original factory load for this is very similar to the .250-3000 Savage.

Improved cartridges
Remington introduced the commercial version of this popular wildcat as a low-pressure round. At the time there were many older actions available of questionable strength. With a modern action and handloading, this cartridge is capable of markedly improved performance.

One of the common improvements is called the ".257 Roberts +P" which has a SAAMI maximum pressure limit of  compared to the  listed for the standard .257 Roberts.

P.O. Ackley said that the .257 Roberts Ackley Improved was probably the most useful all-around cartridge. Making an Ackley Improved cartridge usually meant modifying the chamber to have a steeper shoulder and blown-out sides to provide greater powder capacity while still allowing factory ammunition to be fired safely.

Comparison
Data below shows sample muzzle velocities and muzzle energies for a  test barrel, except .250-3000 Savage, which is for a  test barrel and .257 Weatherby Magnum, which is for a  test barrel.

See also
 6 mm caliber
 Delta L problem
 List of rifle cartridges
 Table of handgun and rifle cartridges

References

External links
 .257 Roberts at Reloaders Nest
 .257 Roberts (257 Roberts +P) at The Reload Bench

Pistol and rifle cartridges
Remington Arms cartridges
Wildcat cartridges